Basem Darwisch (Arabic: باسم درويش) (born April 1966) is an Egyptian–German composer, producer and oud virtuoso. He is the founder of Cairo Steps Ensemble, He is the first musician in the Middle East to be awarded the German golden jazz award in 2018 and 2021.

Education 
Darwisch studied German linguistics at Ain Shams University and classical music at the Arabic music academy in Cairo. He won prizes for Best Oud Player in 1985 and 1986.

By the end of 1986 he had moved to Austria and then Germany, where he studied Egyptology and ethnology at Heidelberg University.

Career 
Darwisch started his professional carrier in 1986 at the Theatre of AlTali'aa in Cairo with the Egyptian composer Waguih Aziz, In 1994 he joined the folklore group Salamat in Germany with Sudanese and Egyptian musicians. He played with Salamat for many years in France, Spain, England and Germany.

Darwisch joined many Afro Egyptian and Arabic groups in Europe between 1994 and 1997. Then in 1997 in Berlin with Hossam Shaker they founded new form of the Egyptian group Rahalah, with different concerts, workshops in Spain, Germany and Egypt.

In 1999, he joined Sharkiat band for Fathy Salama, Grammy award 2005 winner in concerts in Cairo opera house, El Qalaa Festival and Alexandria in Egypt. In 2000 Darwisch joined Mohamed Mounir Band and played with Mounir Concerts in Morocco, Berlin and other European cities.

In 2000, Darwisch formed with the German pianist Matthias Frey and former BAP Saxophonist Büdi Siebert an oriental jazz Trio with Concerts in Germany and Egypt.

Discography 
Bassem Darwisch led his team, Cairo Steps, to produce 5 albums and a large number of singles:

Awards 
On 19 April 2018, Cairo Steps Founder Basem Darwisch collected The German Jazz Music award at Berlin ceremony with the ensemble members including Inas Abdeldayem,  Minister of Culture of Egypt, The ensemble received the award for their album Flying Carpet, which they created with German band Quadro Nuevo.

On 12 October 2021, Basem Darwisch collected The German Jazz Music award with Quadro Nuevo for his track "Cafe Groppi" in their album "MARE".

References 

1966 births
Ain Shams University alumni
Egyptian composers
Egyptian musicians
Living people